Magic Leap, Inc. is an American technology company that released a head-mounted virtual retinal display, called Magic Leap One, which superimposes 3D computer-generated imagery over real world objects, by "projecting a digital light field into the user's eye", involving technologies potentially suited to applications in augmented reality and computer vision. It is attempting to construct a light-field chip using silicon photonics.

Magic Leap was founded by Rony Abovitz in 2010 and has raised $2.6 billion from a list of investors including Google and Alibaba Group. In December 2016, Forbes estimated that Magic Leap was worth $4.5 billion. On July 11, 2018, AT&T invested in the company and became its exclusive partner. On August 8, 2018, the Magic Leap One was made available in the United States through AT&T.

On May 28, 2020, Rony Abovitz announced that Magic Leap had raised $350 million in new funding and that he would be stepping down as CEO. On July 7, 2020, the company announced their new CEO would be former Microsoft executive, Peggy Johnson.

History

2010–2014: founding and secrecy 
Magic Leap was founded by Rony Abovitz in 2010. According to past versions of its website, the startup evolved from a company named "Magic Leap Studios" which around 2010 was working on a graphic novel and a feature film series, and in 2011 became a corporation, releasing an augmented reality app at Comic-Con that year. In October 2014, when the company was still operating in stealth mode (but already reported to be working on projects relating to augmented reality and computer vision), it raised more than $540 million of venture funding from Google, Qualcomm, Andreessen Horowitz and Kleiner Perkins, among other investors.

A November 2014 analysis by Gizmodo, based on job listings, trademark registrations and patent applications from Magic Leap, concluded that the company appeared to be building a competitor to the Google Glass and Oculus Rift that would "blend computer-generated graphics with the real world". It had also been compared to Microsoft HoloLens.

Before Magic Leap, a head-mounted display using light field had been demonstrated by Nvidia in 2013, and the MIT Media Lab has also constructed a 3D display using "compressed light fields"; however, Magic Leap asserts that it achieves better resolution with a new proprietary technique that projects an image directly onto the user's retina. According to a researcher who studied the company's patents, Magic Leap is likely to use stacked silicon waveguides.

Richard Taylor of special effects company Weta Workshop is involved in Magic Leap alongside Abovitz. Science fiction author Neal Stephenson joined the company in December 2014. Graeme Devine is their Chief Creative Officer & Senior VP Games, Apps and Creative Experiences.

2015–2018: product teases and reveal 
On March 19, 2015, Magic Leap released a demo video titled "Just another day in the office at Magic Leap". The video includes augmented reality gaming and productivity applications but it was unclear if the video was actual footage using their technology or a simulated experience.

On October 20, 2015, Magic Leap released actual footage of their product. While still not showing any hardware, the footage claims that it was filmed through a Magic Leap device without the use of special effects or compositing. The video suggests that virtual 3D objects can be occluded by real objects, which may be predefined geometry in the scene but led to speculation about 3D spatial mapping being used. It also shows virtual lights reflecting from a real table, which seem to be incorrectly placed in space, and therefore may suggest that the reflections are part of the virtual scene without interacting with the real world (similarly to "fake" shadows in early video games). The video showcases only quite bright objects superimposed over dark areas of the real world. This suggests that the hardware can only add new light without blocking incoming light from the real world. This would allow it to render only fully transparent objects which emit or reflect light, and may not allow virtual objects to occlude real objects.

On December 9, 2015, Forbes reported on documents filed in the state of Delaware, indicating a Series C funding round of $827m. This funding round could bring the company's total funding to $1.4 billion, and its post-money valuation to $3.7 billion. On February 2, 2016, Financial Times reported that Magic Leap further raised another funding round of close to $800m, valuing the startup at $4.5 billion.

On February 11, 2016, Silicon Angle reported that Magic Leap had joined the Entertainment Software Association.

On June 16, 2016, Magic Leap announced a partnership with Disney's Lucasfilm and its ILMxLAB R&D unit. The two companies would form a joint research lab at Lucasfilm's San Francisco campus.

On December 20, 2017, Magic Leap unveiled their Magic Leap One, to be shipped the following year.

In December 2017, UK technology news site The Register described Magic Leap as a vaporware company that "has received nearly $2bn in funding over four years, values itself at $6bn, and has yet to produce anything but fake technology".

On March 7, 2018, Magic Leap raised $461 million in Series D funding led by the Public Investment Fund of Saudi Arabia, the country's sovereign wealth fund.

In June 2018, the company's first headset, called the Magic Leap One, was showcased for the first time online, only showcasing the device visually but performing no demonstration of its functionality.

On July 1, 2018, the device was finally demoed, confirming its use of NVIDIA TX2 hardware. The general reaction was of disappointment with what was shown, based on what had been promised up to that point.

2018–present: product launches 
2018

On July 11, 2018, AT&T invested in the company, set to become its exclusive partner. Magic Leap One became the first product to be sold only in AT&T-owned stores across the United States. Also AT&T Communications' CEO John Donovan is set to become a board member of the company.

On October 10, 2018, Magic Leap introduced Mica, a human-like AI assistant.

2019

In April 2019, it was reported that Magic Leap had raised an additional $280 million from NTT Docomo as part of a partnership announced by the two companies.

In November 2019, it was reported that Magic Leap assigned all of its US patents to J.P. Morgan Chase in August 2019. The company also announced a significant financing round, which would become its series E when complete.

2020

On April 22, 2020, Magic Leap indicated a major company restructuring and that half of the company's staff would be laid off due to the COVID-19 pandemic. Despite the job cuts, the company raised $350 million in May 2020.

In September 2020, The Information reported that the company valuation was $6.4 billion in 2019 and by June 2020 it dropped to $450 million, by 93 percent in six months.

2021

In October 2021, Venture Beat reported that the company's valuation was $2 billion after raising $500 million from an unidentified source and that the company would unveil the new Magic Leap 2 AR headset in 2022 (“select customers” are already using it in 2021 as part of an early access program).

In October 2021, Magic Leap's CEO announced Magic Leap 2 would be the "industry’s smallest and lightest device" for business uses, with a significantly larger field of view, and include a dimming feature to be used in brightly lit settings.

2022

On September 30th, 2022, Magic Leap officially released its latest AR Headset, the Magic Leap 2.

Acquisitions 
 April 18, 2016: Israeli cybersecurity company NorthBit
 February 18, 2017: the 3D division of Swiss computer vision company Dacuda
 Early 2018: military startup Chosen Realities
 May 2019: Belgian startup Mimesys, developer of volumetric video conferencing software for the Magic Leap platform

See also
CastAR
Google Glass
Microsoft HoloLens
Meta (augmented reality company)

References

Further reading

External links
Company website

American companies established in 2010
Technology companies established in 2010
Technology companies of the United States
Companies based in Broward County, Florida
Augmented reality
Virtual reality companies
2010 establishments in Florida
Plantation, Florida
Wearable devices